Arturo Pérez-Reverte Gutiérrez (born 25 November 1951 in Cartagena) is a Spanish novelist and journalist.  He worked as a war correspondent for RTVE for 21 years (1973–1994). His first novel, El húsar, set in the Napoleonic Wars, was released in 1986.  

He is well known outside Spain for his "Alatriste" series of novels, which have been translated into multiple languages. Since 2003 he has been a member of the Royal Spanish Academy.

Writing
Pérez-Reverte's novels are usually centered on one strongly defined character, and his plots move along swiftly, often featuring a narrator who is part of the story but apart from it. Most of his novels take place in Spain or around the Mediterranean. They often draw on numerous references to Spanish history, colonial past, art and culture, ancient treasures and the sea. The novels frequently deal with some of the major issues of modern Spain, such as drug trafficking or the relationship of religion and politics.

Often, Pérez-Reverte's novels have two plots running in parallel with little connection between them except for shared characters.  For example, in The Club Dumas, the protagonist is searching the world for a lost book and keeps meeting people who parallel figures from Dumas's novels; in The Flanders Panel, a contemporary serial killer is juxtaposed with the mystery of a 500-year-old assassination.

In his often polemical newspaper columns and the main characters of his novels, Pérez-Reverte frequently expresses pessimism about human behaviour, shaped by his wartime experiences in such places as El Salvador, Croatia or Bosnia. His views have also been shaped by his research for crime shows.

Throughout his career, and especially in its latter half, he has been noted for cultivating his  trademark maverick, non-partisan and at times abrasive persona. This has occasionally been a source of conflict with other journalists and writers. He originally refused to have his novels translated from the original Spanish to any language other than French. However, English translations were eventually published for some of his works, and most of his work is also available in Portuguese and Polish.

Pérez-Reverte was elected to seat T of the Real Academia Española on 23 January 2003; he took up his seat on 12 June the same year.

Themes such as the hero's tiredness, adventure, friendship, the journey as danger, death as the last journey, and culture and memory as the only salvation that allows understanding reality, enduring pain and knowing the identity of the person and the world are frequent in his novels. The writer's view of existence in general is bleak. He hates Christian humanism and believes that pagan philosophy has a more accurate view of the world. Typical Revertian characters are the weary hero in hostile territory with a dark past and the femme fatal. Among the traits of the characters, the moral ambiguity stands out.

In the articles he publishes every Sunday in XLSemanal magazine, he harshly criticizes postmodernity, political correctness, gender ideology, neoliberalism, neoconservatism, the critical pedagogy, the European Union, the inclusive language and the woke thought. These articles were published in the following books: Patente de corso (1993-1998), Con ánimo de ofender (1998-2001), No me cogeréis vivo (2001-2005) and When we were honorable mercenaries (2005-2009).
He regrets that society is conditioned by the "whim of minorities" and that Europe, "the moral reference of the West", copies the values ​​of society in the United States, considered by him as "sick and hypocritical" .

An active user on Twitter, he has already created numerous controversies. In a controversial article he compared the European refugee crisis with the barbarian invasions that led to the fall of the Roman Empire.  However, he was awarded the "Premio Don Quijote"
of journalism.

In 1998 he published a very harsh article against global capitalism that prophesied the world 2007–2008 financial crisis. This article was very successful on the internet when the crisis happened in Spain.

Awards and recognition 
The Painter of Battles was the winner of the 2008 Premio Gregor von Rezzori award for foreign fiction translated into Italian.
In 2016 Pérez-Reverte was named as one of the 10 most important writers of the year by the Spanish national newspaper ABC, alongside novelists including Eduardo Mendoza and Andrés Pascual.

Personal life

Pérez-Reverte started his journalistic career writing for the now-defunct newspaper Pueblo and then for Televisión Española (the Spanish state-owned television broadcaster), often as a war correspondent. Becoming weary of the internal affairs at TVE, he resigned as a journalist and decided to work full-time as a writer.

His teenage daughter Carlota was billed as a co-author of his first Alatriste novel. He lives between La Navata (near Madrid) and his native Cartagena, from where he enjoys sailing solo in the Mediterranean. He is a friend of Javier Marías, who presented Pérez-Reverte with the title of Duke of Corso of the Kingdom of Redonda micro nation.

His nephew Arturo Juan Pérez-Reverte is a professional footballer playing for FC Cartagena.

Perez-Reverte owns a library which has an estimated of 32,000 books.

Controversies

Mexican novelist Verónica Murguía accused Arturo Pérez-Reverte of plagiarizing her work. On 10 November 1997 Murguía published a short story, titled "Historia de Sami", in the magazine El laberinto urbano. Months later, in March 1998, Pérez-Reverte published a story in El Semanal, with the title "Un chucho mejicano", bearing close similarities in narration, chronology, phrases, and in the anecdote. Pérez-Reverte's story was recently republished in a re-compilation for the text Perros e hijos de perra (Alfaguara), and Murguía noticed the plagiarism at that time. Murguía would not proceed with a legal case but asked for an apology and the removal of the story from his text.  Meanwhile, Pérez-Reverte apologized and noted that the story he published he wrote exactly as it was told to him by writer Sealtiel Alatriste.

Pérez-Reverte's script for the film Gitano in the late 1990s also brought another charge of plagiarism against him. In May 2011 the Audiencia Provincial of Madrid ordered Pérez-Reverte and Manuel Palacios, director and co-writer of Gitano, to pay 80,000 euros to filmmaker Antonio González-Vigil, who had sued them for alleged plagiarism of the film's script. Pérez-Reverte described this decision as "a clear ambush" and a "clear manoeuvre to extort money." The ruling contradicted two previous criminal rulings, and one from a merchant judiciary which had all decided in favor of  Pérez-Reverte and Palacios. In July 2013 the Audiencia Provincial of Madrid ordered Pérez-Reverte to pay 200,000 euros to González-Vigil for plagiarism.

Bibliography

Captain Alatriste novels
 El capitán Alatriste (1996; tr: Captain Alatriste, Plume 2005), presenting the character of a swordsman in the Spanish Golden Age.
 Limpieza de sangre (1997; tr: Purity of Blood), about the "purity of blood" demanded from Conversos.
 El sol de Breda (1998; tr: The Sun over Breda), about the war in the Spanish Netherlands – specifically, the Siege of Breda.
 El oro del rey (2000; tr: The King's Gold), about the Spanish treasure fleet.
 El caballero del jubón amarillo (2003; tr: The Cavalier in the Yellow Doublet). Alatriste clashes with king Philip IV of Spain.
 Corsarios de Levante (2006; tr. Pirates of the Levant). Alatriste fights Barbary pirates across the Mediterranean.
 El puente de los Asesinos (2011). Alatriste is involved in a conspiracy to kill the Doge of Venice.

Falcó novels
 Falcó (2016)- Lorenzo Falcó is an intelligence operative working for the Nationalists during the Spanish Civil War, who embarks on a mission whose outcome may turn the tide of the war.
 Eva (2017) -A new mission takes Falcó to Tangier, where he must prevent the departure of the Moscow gold shipment.
Sabotaje (2018)- Falcó travels to Paris for a new mission involving painter Pablo Picasso.

Other novels

 El húsar (1986). The story of a young Hussars officer during the Peninsular War
 El maestro de esgrima (1988; tr: The Fencing Master, Mariner Books, 2004. ). A mysterious lady requests lessons from a fencing master.
 La tabla de Flandes (1990; tr: The Flanders Panel). The mystery surrounding the relationship between a serial killer and a mysterious medieval Flemish painting.
 El club Dumas or La sombra de Richelieu (1993; tr: The Club Dumas ). A cult of followers of the novels of Alexandre Dumas.
 La sombra del águila (1993). Set during the Napoleonic invasion of Russia.
 Territorio comanche (1994). A novelization of his experiences as a war reporter during the Yugoslav Wars.
 La piel del tambor (1995; tr: The Seville Communion). A thriller involving hackers, the Vatican and the lost treasure of a privateer.
 Un asunto de honor (1995). The story of an underaged prostitute.
 La carta esférica (2000; tr: The Nautical Chart). The story of a retired sailor who longs for the sea.
 La Reina del Sur (2002; tr: The Queen of the South ). The story of a Mexican woman who becomes the leader of a drug trafficking cartel in southern Spain.
 Cabo Trafalgar (2004), about the battle of Trafalgar.
 El pintor de batallas (2006; tr: The Painter of Battles). A retired war photographer confronts his past.
 Un día de cólera (2007). 2 May 1808. The battle in Madrid against the French army for independence, hour to hour.
 Ojos azules (2009). Spanish soldiers flee the Aztecs.
 El Asedio (2010; tr The Siege by Frank Wynne). Set in 1811, during the siege of Cádiz.
 El tango de la guardia vieja (2012; tr: What We Become). Romantic novel set across the world during the first half of the Twentieth Century.
 El francotirador paciente (2013). A maverick graffiti artist constantly evades capture.
 Hombres buenos (2015). About the Royal Spanish Academy and the Encyclopédie
 Los perros duros no bailan (2018). Novel told from the point of view of a street dog.
 Sidi (2019). About the Castilian knight El Cid.
 Línea de fuego (2020). Nationalists and Republicans clash to capture a strategically important town in Catalonia during the Spanish Civil War.
 El italiano (2021). An Italian Navy diver on a sabotage mission washes ashore in southern Spain during World War II.
 Revolución (2022). A Spanish mining engineer is caught in the chaos brought by the start of the Mexican Revolution.

Non-fiction
 Obra breve (1995)
 Patente de corso (1998). Collection of press columns.
 Con ánimo de ofender (2001). Another collection of columns.
 No me cogeréis vivo (2005)
 Cuando éramos honrados mercenarios (2009)
 Los barcos se pierden en tierra (2011)
 Perros e hijos de perra (2014)
 La guerra civil contada a los jóvenes (2015). Illustrated by Fernando Vicente.
 Una historia de España (2019)

Films based on novels by Pérez-Reverte 
El maestro de esgrima (1992) (based on The Fencing Master)
Uncovered (1994) (based on The Flanders Panel)
Cachito (1995) (based on Un Asunto de Honor)
Territorio Comanche (1997) (based on Territorio Comanche)
The Ninth Gate, by Roman Polanski (1999) (very loosely based on The Club Dumas)
The Road to Santiago (1999), Spanish television miniseries (story)
Alatriste (2006) (based on the series Captain Alatriste)
The Nautical Chart (2007) (based on The Nautical Chart and starring Aitana Sánchez-Gijón)
Quart: El Hombre de Roma (2007), Spanish television miniseries based on The Seville Communion
La Reina Del Sur (2011), telenovela airing on Telemundo based on The Queen of the South

See also

 Captain Alatriste (the books)
 Alatriste (the film)
 Café Gijón (Madrid)

References

External links

 
iCorso 

Capitan-Alatriste.com, fan site with an English language section
Unofficial website (very outdated) 
Arturo Pérez-Reverte at XLSemanal 

1951 births
Living people
20th-century Spanish novelists
21st-century Spanish novelists
Members of the Royal Spanish Academy
Spanish reporters and correspondents
Spanish male novelists
Spanish television presenters
Spanish historical novelists
Spanish travel writers
21st-century travel writers
Spanish war correspondents
Writers from Cartagena, Spain
Writers of historical fiction set in the early modern period
Writers of historical fiction set in the modern age
20th-century Spanish male writers
21st-century Spanish male writers